"Tear You Apart" is a song by American rock band She Wants Revenge. It was released as the second single from their self-titled debut studio album in January 2006 in the U.S. and July 17, 2006 in the UK. The song reached number 6 on the Billboard Alternative Songs chart and number 122 on the Billboard Hot 100.

In 2015, the song was featured in the season premiere of American Horror Story: Hotel, as personally requested by Lady Gaga, one of the show's main actresses. The then-disbanded She Wants Revenge gained a significant revival in popularity as a result of the media usage, and were inspired to reunite as a result.

Track listing
"Tear You Apart" – 4:46
"Tear You Apart" (Ladytron Mix) – 5:12

Additional versions
Visitors to DJ and remixer Richard Vission's website could access two exclusive promo remixes by signing up to his email newsletter.
"Tear You Apart" (Vission Wants Revenge Vox) – 6:28
"Tear You Apart" (Vission Wants Revenge Edit) – 4:26

Another remix was available for free download from the band's Myspace page.
"Tear You Apart" (Hotel Persona Remix) – 5:25 [sometimes referred to as "HP Mix" or "HP Remix"]

Another remix can be found on the Japanese version of the self-titled album.
"Tear You Apart" (Chris Holmes vs. Bystanders Remix) – 4:01

Music video
The music video for "Tear You Apart" was directed by Joaquin Phoenix. It was filmed in a middle school in Hollywood. The dance was held in a gym. The band's HQ was in the ballet studio of the school.

The scene where Lydia runs out is fake. She does not run into a hallway but instead, at the time of production, she ran into an alley.

A note was sent out via Myspace asking for extras. Only a small  number of them were actually highschoolers; the call was for people who were either 15–20 or looked like they were 15–20. No one was paid, and filming was done around 3:00 AM the following day.

Appearance in other media
The song was used in CW's hit TV show One Tree Hill in the episode 14 of season 3 All Tomorrow's Parties.
The Number 23, a psychological suspense film directed by Joel Schumacher and starring Jim Carrey and Virginia Madsen. It's set to a scene featuring the characters portrayed by Carrey and Madsen engaging in S&M-style sex shortly after meeting near a fiery vehicle.

The song was featured in the action scene of Antikiller 3.
The song was featured in the TV show American Horror Story: Hotel during the season premiere, "Checking In". The scene introduces The Countess (Lady Gaga) and her lover Donovan (Matt Bomer).
The song also appeared in a night club scene in the TV show Fringe during episode 18 of season 1.

Notes
In the music video, Adam and Justin are mentioned as "missing".
On the Late Show with David Letterman, along with other TV appearances, the chorus lyrics changed from "I want to fucking tear you apart" to "I'd really love to tear you apart".

Charts

Weekly charts

Year-end charts

Certifications

References

External links
 

2006 singles
She Wants Revenge songs
2006 songs
Songs written by Adam Bravin